Adhugo is a 2018 Indian Telugu-language fantasy comedy film written and directed by Ravi Babu. It stars Nabha Natesh, Rakesh Rachakonda, and Abhishek Varma. The film follows a piglet named Bunty as the protagonist.

It is India's first film featuring a live-action 3D animated title character.

Plot

Bunty a Cute Piglet Gets Misplaced through a courier and lands in the hands of a girl Nabha Natesh and a Guy Rakesh Rachakonda looking for their lost puppy, A gang led by  Sixpack Shankar (Ravi Babu) and a few other Gangsters are also after the piglet things go out of hand, how the piglet evades them all forms the rest of the story.

Cast
 Ravi Babu as Six Pack Shankar
 Nabha Natesh as Raji
 Rakesh Rachakonda
 Abhishek Varma

Soundtrack

Music was composed by Prashanth R Vihari and released on Mango Music.

Reviews
The film generally received poor reviews with critics labelling it as poorly executed and not living up to the hype.

References

External links 
 

2018 films
2010s Telugu-language films
2010s fantasy comedy films
Indian fantasy comedy films
Indian films with live action and animation
Films directed by Ravi Babu
2018 comedy films
Films about pigs